Rapson may refer to:

People
John Rapson (born 1953), American jazz trombonist
Edward James Rapson (1861–1937), numismat and historian
Ralph Rapson (1914–2008), American architect
Rip Rapson (born 1952), American attorney and philanthropist
Syd Rapson (born 1942), British politician; MP from Portsmouth North 1997–2005
William Sage Rapson (1912–1999), New Zealand and South African chemist

Places
Rapson, Michigan, an unincorporated community in the United States